Mount Lambak is an inselberg in Kluang District, Johor, Malaysia. The summit is 510 m above sea level. Gunung Lambak is the Hausberg of Kluang.

Mount Lambak Recreational Forest
It has been developed as a recreational and tourist attraction called Mount Lambak Recreational Forest. Pathways and wooden bridges make it relatively easy to climb to the summit, and a picnic spot at the base of the mountain has car parking, benches, a small children's playground and toilets. There is also chalet accommodation, camping facilities and a swimming pool.

Mammals found on Gunung Lambak include the Long-tailed macaque, Pig-tailed macaque and Dusky leaf monkey.

Broadcasting mast
The television station RTM completed a transmitter on Gunung Lambak in 1969 to provide good reception in Kluang. It closed in 1983, superseded by a transmitter at Mount Ledang in Tangkak District. The mast still stands at the summit of Gunung Lambak.

See also
 Geography of Malaysia

References

Kluang District
Lambak